Suininki is a medium-sized lake in the Koutajoki main catchment area. It is located in Kuusamo municipality the region of Northern Ostrobothnia in Finland. Lake Suininki is a part of the Kuusinki catchment area.

See also
List of lakes in Finland

References

External links
 http://www.ruka.fi/winter_eng/frontpage/?file=content_exec&id=1281

Lakes of Kuusamo